Peter Phillips (born 1977) is the son of Anne, Princess Royal of the United Kingdom.

Peter Phillips, Philips, or Philipps may also refer to:
 Peter Philips (c. 1560–1628), English composer
 Peter Phillips (judge) (1731–1807), Justice of the Rhode Island Supreme Court
 Peter Phillips (author) (1920–2012), British writer
 Peter Philips (politician) (1927–2009), Australian politician
 Peter Phillips (artist) (born 1939), English artist
 Peter Phillips (athlete) (born 1942), Australian former shot putter and weightlifter
 Peter C. B. Phillips (born 1948), British economist
 Peter Phillips (politician) (born 1949), president of the People's National Party and opposition leader in Jamaica
 Peter Phillips (conductor) (born 1953), director of the Tallis Scholars
 Peter Phillips (rugby league) (born 1969), Australian rugby league player
 Pete Rock or Peter Phillips (born 1970), producer and rapper
 Peter Philips (make-up artist) (fl. 1993–2014), Belgian make-up artist and creative director for Chanel
 Peter Philipps (1835–1917), American politician
 Peter Phillips, a character in All Over Town
 Peter Andrew Jestyn Phillips, chief executive of Cambridge University Press & Assessment